Roman Road was a one-off TV Drama that aired on ITV on 31 December 2004.

Plot summary
Vince is a writer who suddenly decides to visit his old college friend Matt (who knows more than a bit about map-reading) to join him on an expedition. They both set off to walk the Roman road from Chichester to London, but it doesn't take long for it to become apparent that they're being chased by a mystery man in a fast car. It seems Vince has something in his backpack that someone wants very badly indeed.

Cast

External links

ITV (TV network) original programming
British television films
2004 television films
2004 films